Goat's rue may refer to:

 Galega officinalis
 Tephrosia lindheimeri
 Tephrosia virginiana, native to the United States

Fabaceae